Loess Hills District is an  American Viticultural Area (AVA) located in western Iowa and northwestern Missouri established on April 4, 2016 by the U.S. Department of Treasury’s Alcohol and Tobacco Tax and Trade Bureau (TTB).
TTB received a petition from Shirley Frederiksen, on behalf of the Western Iowa Grape Growers Association and the Golden Hills Resource Conservation and Development organization proposing the establishment of the “Loess Hills District.” The district is a long, narrow north–south orientated swath of land along the Big Sioux and Missouri Rivers, covering  from Hawarden, Iowa, to Craig, Missouri. There are approximately 66 commercially-producing vineyards covering a total of  distributed throughout the AVA, along with 13 wineries. Loess Hills District is not a sub-region within any established AVA.

Terroir
Loess Hills District is located in a region characterized by extremely deep layers of wind-deposited soil called “loess”. The loose, crumbly soil composed of quartz, feldspar, mica, and other materials as grounded into a fine powder by glaciers during the Ice Ages. When the glaciers melted, the water pushed this "glacial flour" down the Missouri River Valley. As the waters receded, the exposed silt dried, was dispersed by the prevailing westerly winds and deposited across the landscape over broad areas that have formed the hills over time.
The main benefit of the deep, friable soils is they offer little impediment to root systems where vines can grow deep into the ground in search of nutrients. The soils also drain easily, which is advantageous given the area's high levels of rainfall. Erosion can be an issue in Loess Hills, although, over the years, hillsides were carved out making suitable pockets for winegrowing. These hillside vineyard sites prevent cool air from pooling above the vines, reducing the risk of frost.  Summers are hot and humid with a majority of the annual precipitation concentrated in the warmer months. In contrast, it is not unusual to see vineyards blanketed in snow throughout the winter period.

Wine industry
Many vineyards and wineries are clustered around the border city of Omaha Nebraska, which provides a steady stream of visitors to the area. The climate here is continental. Therefore, successful viticulture depends on range of different mesoclimates throughout the area that require a favorable altitude, slope and aspect of the vineyard.

References

External links
  Loess Hills District Wine Trail
  Iowa Wine Growers Association
 TTB AVA Map

American Viticultural Areas
Iowa wine
Missouri wine
2016 establishments in Iowa